Ron Hector Meadmore (December 26, 1933 – August 3, 2013) was a Canadian football player who played for the Winnipeg Blue Bombers. He won the Grey Cup with them in 1958, 1959, 1961 and 1962. He also played for three years with the Saskatchewan Roughriders. Meadmore married Marion Ironquill, the first indigenous lawyer of Canada, in 1954. After his football career, he was a farmer. He died in 2013.

References

1933 births
Players of Canadian football from Manitoba
Winnipeg Blue Bombers players
2013 deaths